A Monster and a Half is a 1964 Italian comedy film directed by Steno starring the comic duo Franco and Ciccio.

Cast 

Franco Franchi as Franco/Cesarone
Ciccio Ingrassia as  The Professor 
Alberto Bonucci as  Prof. Carogni
Margaret Lee as  Christine
Anna Maria Bottini as  Barbara
Lena von Martens as  signorina Marini
Giuseppe Pertile as  Guardiano della prigione
Consalvo Dell'Arti as  Guardiano
Renato Terra as Poliziotto

References

External links

1964 films
Italian comedy films
1964 comedy films
Films directed by Stefano Vanzina
1960s Italian-language films
1960s Italian films